Bareyo is a municipality located in the autonomous community of Cantabria, Spain. According to the 2007 census, the city has a population of 1.702 inhabitants. Its capital is Ajo.

Towns
Ajo (Capital)
Bareyo
Güemes

References

External links
Bareyo - Cantabria 102 Municipios

Municipalities in Cantabria